Roman Akhalkatsi (born 20 February 1980) is a Georgian former footballer who played as a midfielder.

He was the first Georgian to play in the A PFG.

Azerbaijan statistics

References

External links
Profile at KLISF
Player profile

1980 births
Living people
Footballers from Georgia (country)
Expatriate footballers in Russia
Expatriate footballers in Azerbaijan
FC Lokomotiv Moscow players
FC Baltika Kaliningrad players
FK Karvan players
Simurq PIK players
People from Gori, Georgia
Expatriate sportspeople from Georgia (country) in Azerbaijan
FC Dila Gori players
FC Kolkheti-1913 Poti players
FC Torpedo Kutaisi players
FC Metalurgi Rustavi players
Association football midfielders